Steenstrupia may refer to:
 Steenstrupia, a genus of hydrozoans in the family Corymorphidae, synonym of Corymorpha
 Steenstrupia, a genus of cephalopods in the family Architeuthidae, synonym of Architeuthis
Steenstrupia (journal), a scientific journal merged into the European Journal of Taxonomy